Roy "Gramps" Morgan (born July 7, 1976), is a Jamaican singer, instrumentalist, producer, record executive, and entrepreneur. Gramps was born in Brooklyn, New York, but was raised partially in Springfield, Massachusetts. He is the son of well-known reggae artiste Denroy Morgan, and member of Grammy Award-winning reggae band Morgan Heritage. Most of his brothers and sisters are also in the music business.

Early life
Gramps Morgan was born in Brooklyn, New York, in a large family of 30 children. He was raised in Springfield, Massachusetts by his mother, Pearl Foster, and father, Denroy Morgan. He attended Springfield Central High School in Springfield, Massachusetts with the likes of former NBA player Travis Best. Gramps was a star football player and had multiple scholarship offers to colleges and universities around the country. His passion for music that was embedded at such a young age won the battle between a future in sports versus music. Nevertheless, Gramps was destined for a life in entertainment and continues to do so through his band and on his solo career path.

Career
Following in the steps of his father, he became part of the Morgan Heritage formed in 1994 together with four of his siblings. The other band members are Peter "Peetah" Morgan, Una Morgan, Nakhamyah "Lukes" Morgan and Memmalatel "Mr. Mojo" Morgan. Gramps Morgan plays the keyboard in the band and is also a vocalist alongside Peetah Morgan, the main vocalist. For over two decades, they have had a number of successful reggae albums. To date, the band has released 12 albums, including 2016 Grammy Award Winning Best Reggae Album Strictly Roots. Additionally, Morgan Heritage received 2 Grammy nominations for their album Avrakedabra released in 2017 and feature on Shaggy and Sting's album titled 44/876.

Solo career
Gramps Morgan has also flourished as a successful solo artist and created his own label, Dada Son Entertainment. Gramps has toured and performed with the likes of India.Arie, Buju Banton, John Legend, Tarrus Riley, and Kymani Marley. In 2009, Gramps released his debut solo album entitled 2 Sides of My Heart, Vol. 1, which earned him a number awards. He was also featured on the India.Arie song "Therapy" that charted in the United States. His second solo album, Reggae Music Lives, was released in 2012. Again, Gramps featured on an India.Arie album entitled Songversation. Gramps continues to expand his vocal diversity with upcoming music in a variety of genres recording from all parts of the world.  

In 2020, Gramps Morgan released several solo singles including "Runaway Bay" and "People Like You." The latter was nominated in 2021 for three International Reggae and World Music Awards (IRAWMA) in the categories of Best Song, Best Crossover Song and Best Gospel Song, and won the award for Best Gospel Song.  Gramps Morgan was also nominated for Best Male Vocalist.   

In August 2021, Gramps Morgan released his third solo album, Positive Vibration, produced by Canadian Juno Award-winning singer-songwriter Johnny Reid. The album features guest appearances by India.Arie, Shaggy, Lybran, Denroy Morgan and Jemere Morgan.

Personal life

Gramps Morgan currently resides in Nashville, Tennessee, where he is an active community member and hosts his own radio show on Acme Radio. He is married to cell and developmental biologist, Dr. Annabelle Manalo. Also known as Dr. Annabelle or Dr. Annabelle Morgan, Gramps's wife received her doctorate from Vanderbilt University. Gramps has 11 children, with his oldest child being Jemere Morgan, who is the pinnacle of the Morgan family's 3rd generation of music. Jemere Morgan has released 2 of his own albums, entitled Transitions and Self Confidence, through Dada Son Entertainment. Jemere frequently tours worldwide both alongside his family and with various other acts.

Discography

Albums
2 Sides of My Heart, Vol. 1 (2009)
Reggae Music Lives (2012)
Positive Vibration (2021)

Singles

References

External links 

 Official Site

Jamaican reggae musicians
Jamaican emigrants to the United States
1976 births
Living people